Mayeya Musuku (Kannada: ಮಾಯೆಯ ಮುಸುಕು) is a 1980 Indian Kannada film, directed by B. Y. Ramdas and produced by N. Umapathi, H. K. Srinivasa and B. Y. Ramdas. The film stars Rajesh, Srilalitha, T. N. Balakrishna and B. S. Nithyanand in the lead roles. The film has musical score by T. A. Mothi.

Cast

 Rajesh
 Srilalitha
 T. N. Balakrishna
 B. S. Nithyanand
 Shashikala
 B. Shyamasundara
 S. V. Chalam
 Veerendra Kumar
 Sundaramma
 Indrani
 Rathnamma
 Bhagya
 Jamuna
 Geetha
 Hemavathi
 Madevi
 Rani
 V. Sathyanarayana
 Dr. Sadanand

References

External links
 
 

1980s Kannada-language films